Kyaw Than (born 31 May 1965) is a Burmese politician who currently serves as a House of Nationalities member of parliament for Kayah State № 8 constituency.

Early life and education
He was born on 31 May 1965 in Kayah State, Burma (Myanmar). He graduated with B.A. (History) at Zee Pin Gyi.

Political career
He is a member of the Union Solidarity and Development Party. In the Myanmar general election, 2015, he was elected as an Amyotha Hluttaw MP, winning a majority of 1636 votes and elected representative from Kayah State № 8 parliamentary constituency.

References

Union Solidarity and Development Party politicians
1965 births
Living people
People from Kayah State